Witsieshoek, officially called Phuthaditjhaba and also known as QwaQwa, is a town in the Free State province of South Africa. It is located in a section of the Drakensberg mountains (Maloti in the Sesotho language). It borders the province of KwaZulu-Natal to the south east and the independent country of Lesotho to the south west. The town was capital of the bantustan, or homeland, of QwaQwa. When apartheid ended, the town became part of the Free State province.

History
The frequent snow on the Drakensberg mountain peaks surrounding the town led the San to call the region Qwa-Qwa (whiter than white). The Afrikaners named the town Witsieshoek in honour of Oetse (also spelled Witsie and Wetsi), a Makholokoe chief who lived there from 1839 to 1856. The modern official name, Phuthaditjhaba, is a seSotho name that means meeting place of the tribes. It is located on the banks of the Elands River.

The area was inhabited by senior bantu clans of the Basotho namely the Bataung, Bakoena and the Batlokoa.
The Orange Free State government settled these people there in the 1870s after concluding a peace settlement with their leaders. In 1926 the Orange Free State government placed the Batlokoa under the authority of the Bakoena but gave each group its own regional authority in 1930. In 1969 they were combined into a single territorial authority, which was replaced two years later by a legislative assembly. Qwaqwa was granted self-government in 1974.

In 1974 Witsieshoek became capital of the bantustan (or "homeland") of QwaQwa. When the apartheid system was abolished in South Africa in 1994, it became part of the Free State province.

The town is the formal gateway to rural Qwa-Qwa. Service provision in the area is difficult - the land is mountainous and homes in remote areas lack access to basic services. It is the poorest area in the Free State Province.
It is home to the Mofumahadi Manapo Mopeli Regional Hospital.

Sports
The town is the birthplace of the Premier Soccer League side club Free State Stars. Although the club has since relocated to Bethlehem, it still plays its important games at the much larger Charles Mopeli Stadium. The town has two other professional soccer teams, namely Maluti FET College FC and  African Warriors FC who both use the Charles Mopeli Stadium as their homeground. The teams both participate in the National First Division, with Maluti FET College FC making their debut in the division.

See also
Bolata
Witzieshoek Revolt
Makwane
QwaQwa
Tseki
Tshiame
Harrismith

References

Populated places in the Maluti a Phofung Local Municipality